Joseph Clancy  (September 29, 1863 – February 2, 1929) was an American sailor serving in the United States Navy during Boxer Rebellion who received the Medal of Honor for bravery.

Biography
Clancy was born September 29, 1863 in New York City, New York, and after entering the navy Clancy was sent to China to fight in the Boxer Rebellion.

In 1900 he was a chief boatswains mate and participated in the China Relief Expedition.  For heroism during the expedition, he was awarded the Medal of Honor.

He was warranted to the rank of boatswain on May 7, 1901 and promoted to chief boatswain on May 7, 1907.  During World War I he was promoted to lieutenant on July 1, 1918.

He died February 2, 1929, and is buried in the Arlington National Cemetery, Arlington, Virginia. His grave can be found in Section 7-8145-EH

Awards
Medal of Honor
Spanish Campaign Medal
China Relief Expedition Medal
Victory Medal

Medal of Honor citation
Rank and organization: Chief Boatswain's Mate, U.S. Navy. Born: 29 September 1863, New York, N.Y. G.O. No.: 55, 19 July 1901.

Citation:

In action with the relief expedition of the Allied forces in China, 13, 20, 21 and 22 June 1900. During this period and in the presence of the enemy, Clancy distinguished himself by his conduct.

See also

List of Medal of Honor recipients
List of Medal of Honor recipients for the Boxer Rebellion

References
Inline

General

Arlington National Cemetery

1863 births
1929 deaths
United States Navy Medal of Honor recipients
United States Navy officers
Military personnel from New York City
American military personnel of the Boxer Rebellion
Burials at Arlington National Cemetery
Boxer Rebellion recipients of the Medal of Honor
United States Navy personnel of World War I